The Civic Offices is a municipal facility on Emmet Road in Clonmel, County Tipperary, Ireland.

History
The site currently occupied by the Civic Offices was the location of  the county gaol from the late 18th century. The current building, which was originally designed as a militia barracks, was completed in 1875. South Tipperary County Council, which had previously held its meetings in Clonmel Courthouse, moved into the premises in 1927. The county council initially referred to the facility as the "County Council Offices" but latterly referred to it as "County Hall". The building was subsequently extended eastwards along Emmet Road and the county library, on the opposite side of Emmet Road, was completed in 1987.

References

Buildings and structures in County Tipperary
Clonmel